Danya Ariel Dayson (born October 1, 1972) is an associate judge of the Superior Court of the District of Columbia.

Education and career 
Dayson earned her Bachelor of Arts from Appalachian State University and her Juris Doctor from Georgetown University Law Center.

After graduating, she clerked for Judge Robert E. Morin. She then worked in private practice.

D.C. superior court 
President Barack Obama nominated Dayson on July 11, 2011, to a 15-year term as an associate judge of the Superior Court of the District of Columbia to the seat vacated by Stephanie Duncan-Peters. On November 8, 2011, the Senate Committee on Homeland Security and Governmental Affairs held a hearing on her nomination and on the following day, November 9, 2011, the Committee reported her nomination favorably to the senate floor. On November 18, 2011, the full Senate confirmed her nomination by voice vote. She was sworn in on April 27, 2012.

Personal life 
Dayson was born in New York City, raised in Chapel Hill, North Carolina and has lived in Washington, D.C. since 1994. She is married to Michael Murphy and has one child.

References 

1972 births
Living people
21st-century American judges
21st-century American women judges
African-American judges
Appalachian State University alumni
Georgetown University Law Center alumni
Judges of the Superior Court of the District of Columbia
People from Chapel Hill, North Carolina
People from New York City
21st-century African-American women
21st-century African-American people
20th-century African-American people
20th-century African-American women